Video games marketed by the Oculus VR company are designed for the Oculus Rift and other Oculus virtual reality headsets. Oculus games are platform locked, and unlike other competing platforms Oculus does not provide software serials.

Natural locomotion 

Natural locomotion games only use the motion and rotation of the player's head, without apparent camera movement induced by a thumbstick or keyboard, and so do not generally cause players sickness and enable constant presence..

Games marked * have optional artificial locomotion, where teleportation can be added to natural locomotion.

Cockpit locomotion 

Cockpit locomotion games use a vehicle with a cockpit to let the players traverse an environment. Whether this causes motion sickness varies based on multiple factors, including: the player's constitution, the size of the cockpit, and the intensity of motion.

Artificial locomotion 

These games artificially move the "camera", such as thumbstick player movement or on rails camera movement. They can allow for a wider range of experiences, but can cause motion sickness and can be detrimental to presence.

Titles in development 

These games have been announced and are at the moment in development.

See also

 List of Oculus Quest games
 List of HTC Vive games
 List of PlayStation VR games

References

Oculus Rift
 
Oculus Rift games